The Sierra Leone Creole people are an ethnic group of Sierra Leone. The Sierra Leone Creole people are descendants of freed African-American, Afro-Caribbean, and Liberated African slaves who settled in the Western Area of Sierra Leone between 1787 and about 1885. The colony was established by the British, supported by abolitionists, under the Sierra Leone Company as a place for freedmen. The settlers called their new settlement Freetown. Today, the Sierra Leone Creoles are 1.2 percent of the population of Sierra Leone.

Like their Americo-Liberian neighbours and sister ethnic group in Liberia, the Creoles of Sierra Leone  have varying degrees of European ancestry. In Sierra Leone, some of the settlers intermarried with English colonial residents and other Europeans. Through the Jamaican Maroons, some Creoles probably also have indigenous Amerindian Taíno ancestry. The mingling of newly freed black and racially-mixed Nova Scotians and Jamaican Maroons from the 'New World' with  Liberated Africans – such as the Akan, Igbo, and Yoruba – over several generations in the late 18th and early 19th centuries, led to the eventual formation of a Creole ethnicity.

The Americo-Liberians and Sierra Leone Creoles are the only recognised ethnic group of African-American, Liberated African, and Afro-Caribbean descent in West Africa. Thoroughly westernized in their manners and bourgeois in their methods, the Creoles as a class developed close relationships with the British colonial administration; they became educated in British institutions and advanced to prominent leadership positions in colonial Sierra Leone and British West Africa. Partly due to this history, many Sierra Leone Creoles have first names and/or surnames that are anglicized or British in origin.

The vast majority of Creoles reside in Freetown and its surrounding Western Area region of Sierra Leone. They are also Christian. From their mix of peoples, the Creoles developed what is now the native Krio language, a creole deriving from English, indigenous West African languages, and other European languages. It is the most widely spoken language in virtually all parts of Sierra Leone. As the Krio language is spoken by 96 percent of the country's population, it unites all the different ethnic groups, especially in their trade and interaction with each other. Krio is also the primary language of communication among Sierra Leoneans living abroad.

The Sierra Leone Creoles settled across West Africa in the nineteenth century in communities such as Limbe (Cameroon); Conakry (Guinea); Banjul (Gambia); Lagos, Abeokuta, Calabar, Onisha (Nigeria); Accra, Cape Coast (Ghana) and Fernando Pó (Equatorial Guinea). The Krio language of the Creole people influenced other pidgins such as Cameroonian Pidgin English, Nigerian Pidgin English, and Pichinglis. As a result of their history, the Gambian Creole people, or Aku people of the Gambia, the Saro people of Nigeria, and the Krio Fernandinos of Equatorial Guinea, are sub-ethnic groups or partly descended from the Sierra Leone Creole people or their ancestors.

Ethnonymy and overview 
The English word  derives from the French , which in turn came from  Portuguese , a diminutive of cria, meaning a person raised in one's house. The word creole has several cognates in other languages, such as créole, creolo, criol,  criollo,   crioulo, kreol, kreyol, krio, 
kriol, kriolu, and kriyoyo.

In Louisiana, the term Creole has been used since 1792 to represent descendants of African or ethnically mixed parents as well as children of French and Spanish descent with no racial mixing. Its use to describe languages started from 1879, while as an adjective, from 1748. In some Spanish-speaking countries, the word Criollo is used today to describe something local or very typical of a particular Latin American country.

In the Caribbean, the term broadly refers to all the people, whatever their class or ancestry —  African, East Asian, European, Indian — who are part of the culture of the Caribbean.  In Trinidad, the term Creole is used to designate all Trinidadians except those of Asian origin. In French Guiana the term refers to anyone, regardless of skin colour, who has adopted a European way of life, and in neighbouring Suriname, the term refers only to the descendants of enslaved Africans.

In Africa, the term Creole refers to any ethnic group formed during the European colonial era, with some mix of African and non-African racial or cultural heritage. Creole communities are found on most African islands and along the continent's coastal regions where indigenous Africans first interacted with Europeans. As a result of these contacts, five major Creole types emerged: Portuguese, African American, Dutch, French and British.

The Crioulos of African or mixed Portuguese and African descent eventually gave rise to several ethnic groups in Cape Verde, Guinea-Bissau, São Tomé e Príncipe, Angola and Mozambique. The Mauritian  and Seychellois Creoles are Africans with some French cultural ancestry and are Christianized. On La Réunion, the term Creole applies to the descendants of enslaved Africans born on the island, while in South Africa, the blending of East African and Southeast Asian slaves  with Dutch settlers, later produced  a creolized population. The Fernandino Creole peoples of Equatorial Guinea are a mix of Afro-Cubans with Emancipados and English-speaking Liberated Africans, while the Americo-Liberians and Sierra Leone Creoles resulted from the intermingling of African Recaptives with Afro-Caribbeans and African Americans.

Perhaps due to the range of divergent descriptions and lack of a coherent definition, Norwegian anthropologist T. H. Eriksen concludes:  

Today, Creole communities have more in common with each other than they have with any African ethnic groups. On the islands of Africa, creole languages predominate while on the mainland, creole languages are lingua franca or national languages in Guinea-Bissau, Sierra Leone, Liberia, and South Africa. In island communities, Creoles are found in many occupations ranging from agricultural workers to members of society's elite. In the coastal areas of mainland Africa, Creoles acquired economic and political leverage due to their education, culture and close relationships with the colonial administration. They developed a strong sense of ethnic identity and formed their own political organisations. During the independence era of the mid-1900s, some Creoles supported colonial rule but many fought for independence and held positions of power afterwards. In most countries however, Creole political influence gradually gave way to ethnic groups from the interior that were considered 'more African'.

Creole communities in Africa have grown in several ways. Elements of their culture, including language and music, have come to dominate popular culture on the islands. In Creole-established cities on the African mainland, some non-Creoles have assimilated into Creole societies, which are perceived to enjoy privileged  status. Those seeking acceptance into a Creole community usually converted to Christianity, the religion shared by nearly all Creoles.

History 
In 1787, the British helped 400 freed slaves, primarily African Americans freed during the American Revolutionary War who had been evacuated to London, and Afro-Caribbeans and Africans from London, to relocate to Sierra Leone to settle in what they called the "Province of Freedom." Some of these early settlers had been freed earlier and worked as servants in London. Most of the first group died due to disease and warfare with indigenous peoples. About 64 survived to establish the second Granville Town following the failed first attempt at colonization between 1787 and 1789.

In 1792, 1200 Nova Scotian Settlers from Nova Scotia settled and established the Colony of Sierra Leone and the settlement of Freetown; these were African Americans and their descendants. Many of the adults had left Patriot owners and fought for the British in the Revolutionary War. The Crown had offered slaves freedom who left rebel masters, and thousands joined the British lines. The British resettled 3,000 of the African Americans in Nova Scotia, where many found the climate harsh and struggled with discrimination from white Nova Scotians. More than 1,200 volunteered to settle and establish the new colony of Freetown, which was established by British abolitionists under the Sierra Leone Company.

In 1800, the British government also transported 550 Jamaican maroons to Sierra Leone and subsequent waves of African American and Afro-Caribbean immigrants would settle in Sierra Leone throughout the nineteenth and early twentieth centuries.

After Britain and the United States abolished the international African slave trade beginning in 1808, they patrolled off the continent to intercept illegal shipping. The British resettled Liberated Africans from slave ships at Freetown. The Liberated Africans included people from the Yoruba, Igbo, Efik, Fante, and other ethnicities of West Africa.

Some members of indigenous Sierra Leone ethnicities, were also among the Liberated Africans resettled at Freetown; they also assimilated into Creole culture. Others came to the settlement voluntarily, seeing opportunities in Creole culture in the society.

Black Poor and Province of Freedom 1787–1789 

The first settlers to find a colony in Sierra Leone were the so-called "Black Poor": African Americans and Afro-Caribbean. 411 settlers arrived in May 1787. Some were Black Loyalists who were either evacuated or travelled to England to petition for a land of their own; Black Loyalists had joined British forces during the American Revolutionary War, many on promises of freedom from enslavement.

On the voyage between Plymouth and Sierra Leone, 96 passengers died. However, enough survived to establish and build a colony. Seventy white women accompanied the men to Sierra Leone. Anna Falconbridge portrayed these white women as prostitutes from Deptford Prison, but they were most likely wives and girlfriends of the black settlers. Their colony was known as the "Province of Freedom" and their settlement was called "Granville Town"' after the English abolitionist Granville Sharp. The British negotiated for the land for the settlement with the local Temne chief, King Tom.

However, before the ships sailed away from Sierra Leone, 50 white women had died, and about 250 remained of the original 440 who left Plymouth. Another 86 settlers died in the first four months. Although initially there was no hostility between the two groups, after King Tom's death the next Temne chief retaliated for a slave trader's burning of his village. He threatened to destroy Granville Town. The Temne ransacked Granville Town and took some Black Poor into slavery, while others became slave traders. In early 1791 Alexander Falconbridge returned, to find only 64 of the original residents (39 black men, 19 black women, and six white women). The 64 people had been cared for by a Greek and a colonist named Thomas Kallingree at Fourah Bay, an abandoned African village. There the settlers reestablished Granville Town. After that time, they were called the "Old Settlers". By this time the Province of Freedom had been destroyed; Granville Sharp did not lead the next settlement movement.

Nova Scotians and the Freetown Colony 1792–1799 

The proponents and directors of the Sierra Leone colony believed that a new colony did not need black settlers from London. The directors decided to offer resettlement to African Americans from Nova Scotia, despite the failure of the last colony. These settlers were Black Loyalists, American slaves who had escaped to British lines and fought with them during the American Revolution, to earn freedom. The British government had transported more than 3,000 freedmen to Nova Scotia for resettlement, together with white Loyalists. Some of the African Americans were from South Carolina and the Sea Islands, of the Gullah culture; others were from states along the eastern seaboard up to New England.

Some 1200 of these blacks emigrated to Sierra Leone from Halifax Harbour on 15 January 1792, arriving between 28 February and 9 March 1792. On 11 March 1792, the Nova Scotian Settlers disembarked from the 14 passenger ships that had carried them from Nova Scotia to Sierra Leone and marched toward a large cotton tree near George Street. As the Settlers gathered under the tree, their preachers held a thanksgiving service and the white minister, Rev. Patrick Gilbert preached a sermon. After the religious services, the settlement was officially established and was designated Freetown. The Settler men cleared the forest and shrub and built a new settlement on the overgrown site that had formerly contained the Granville Town settlement.

They had a profound influence on Creole culture; many of the Western attributes of Creole society were conveyed by the "Settlers", who continued what was familiar to them from their past lives. In Sierra Leone they were called the Nova Scotians or "Settlers" (the 1787 Settlers were called the Old Settlers). They founded the capital of Sierra Leone in 1792. The descendants of African Americans remained an identifiable ethnic group until the 1870s, when the Creole identity was beginning to form.

Maroons and other transatlantic immigrants 1800–1819 

The next arrivals were the Jamaican Maroons; these maroons came specifically from Cudjoe's Town (Trelawny Town), one of the five Maroon cities in Jamaica. The Maroons mainly descended from highly military skilled Ashanti slaves who had escaped plantations and, to a lesser extent, from Jamaican indigenous people. The Maroons numbered around 551, and they helped quell some of the riots against the British from the settlers. The Maroons later fought against the Temne during the Temne Attack of 1801.

The dispute with the Temne was over "rent" which the Temne felt they were owed by the colony. In a twist that became the hallmark of politics in the subregion, the Temne had indeed signed a treaty granting full sovereignty to the Colony but then turned around to say that this was not their understanding. This misunderstanding became violent, when in 1801, the Temne attacked Freetown. The assault failed, resulting instead in the expulsion of the Temne from the area.

The next migrations of transatlantic immigrants between 1800 and 1819 were smaller in comparison to the early Nova Scotian Settlers and Jamaican Maroon immigrants. Afro-Caribbean and Liberated African soldiers from the 2nd and 4th West India Regiments were settled in Freetown and in suburbs around it in 1819. Barbadian rebels who participated in the Bussa Rebellion were transported to colonial Freetown in 1816 and included families such as the Priddy family.

Thirty-eight African Americans (nine families) immigrated to Freetown under the auspices of African-American ship owner Paul Cuffe, of Boston. These Black Americans included Perry Lockes and Prince Saunders from Boston; Abraham Thompson and Peter Williams Jr. from New York City; and Edward Jones from Charleston, South Carolina. Americo-Liberian merchants and traders also settled in colonial Freetown throughout the course of the nineteenth and early twentieth centuries.

Following the Jamaican Maroons and Barbadian rebels, Afro-Caribbean immigrants settled in Freetown, Sierra Leone and in settlements across the Freetown peninsula throughout the course of the nineteenth and early twentieth centuries as missionaries, artisans and colonial officials such as the Porter family from Jamaica.

Prominent Creole families of more recent Afro-Caribbean ancestry include the Farquhar family and their descendants such as the Stuart family and Conton family who settled in Sierra Leone from Barbados, the Bahamas, and Bermuda between the late nineteenth and early twentieth centuries.

Recaptives or Liberated Africans 1807–1830s 

The last major group of immigrants to the colony was the Liberated Africans or "Recaptives". Held on slave ships for sale in the western hemisphere, they were liberated by the Royal Navy, which, with the West Africa Squadron, enforced the abolition of the international slave trade after 1808.

The Liberated Africans were multi-ethnic and were largely Akan, Aja, Ewe, Angolan, Wolof, Hausa, Yoruba, Igbo, Bambara, Nupe, and Fulani people who had been enslaved by illegal slave traders. The Liberated Africans also included Sherbro, Mende and Temne people who had been enslaved in territories neighbouring the Colony of Sierra Leone.

The Liberated Africans, also called Recaptives, contributed greatly to the Creole culture. While the Settlers, Maroons, and transatlantic immigrants gave the Creoles their Christianity, some of their customs, and their Western influence, the Liberated Africans modified their customs to adopt those of the Nova Scotians and Europeans, yet kept some of their ethnic traditions.

Initially the British colonial administration intervened to ensure the Recaptives became firmly rooted in Freetown society; they served in the army with the West India Regiment, and they were assigned as apprentices in the houses of Settlers and Maroons. Sometimes if a child's parents died, the young Recaptive would be adopted by a Settler or Maroon family. The two groups mixed and mingled in society.

As the Recaptives began to trade and spread Christianity throughout West Africa, they began to dominate Freetown society. The Recaptives intermarried with the Settlers and Maroons, and the two groups became a fusion of African and Western societies.

Settlements
The ancestors of the Creoles founded Freetown, Sierra Leone in 1792. They based the plan on what they were familiar with – the grid of a North American colonial town.  The families originally from Nova Scotia – the Balls, Burdens, Chambers, Davis, Dixons, Georges (descendants of David George), Keelings, Leighs, Moores, Peters (descendants of Thomas Peters or Stephen Peters), Prestons, Snowballs, Staffords, Turners, Willoughsby, Williams, and the Goodings – took up residence in Settler Town. The town was in close proximity to Cline Town (then Granville Town).  Eighty percent of Nova Scotians lived on five streets: Rawdon, Wilberforce, Howe, East, and Charlotte street.

The next group of settlers were Jamaican Maroons from Cudjoe's Town, who arrived in Freetown, via Nova Scotia,  in 1800. Notable families such as the Jarretts, Smiths, Hortons, Coles, Porters, Jones,  and the Morgans, settled in Maroon Town, Sierra Leone.  Seventy percent of Maroons lived on five streets: Gloucester, George, Trelawney, Walpole, and Westmoreland street.  The Jamaican Maroon settlement was west of Settler Town between Walpole street and King Tom.

The Liberated African ancestors – principally of Yoruba, Akan and Igbo origin – settled across the Western Area peninsula of Sierra Leone. By the 1850s, they had already established Aberdeen,  Bathurst, Charlotte, 
Dublin, Gloucester, Goderich, Grafton, Hastings, Kent, Kissy, Leicester, Murray Town, Regent, Ricketts, Sussex, Waterloo, Wellington,  Wilberforce and York.

Between the late 18th and early 20th centuries, immigrants from the Bahamas, Barbados, Bermuda, Liberia and the Gold Coast likewise settled in Freetown and eventually coalesced into the Sierra Leone Creole identity. In the 21st century, the majority of Creoles in Sierra Leone continue to reside in Freetown and along the surrounding Western Area peninsula where their language and culture have a disproportionate influence relative to their population. 

The Creole people acted as colonial administrators, traders and missionaries in other parts of West Africa during the 19th century, and as a result, there are also Creole communities in The Gambia, Nigeria, Cameroon, and Equatorial Guinea. Due to normal migration patterns, the Sierra Leone Civil War, and some discrimination at home,  many Sierra Leone Creoles live abroad in the United States and the United Kingdom.  In the United States, Creoles are mostly settled in Washington DC, Maryland, Virginia, Texas, New York, Georgia, California and North Carolina.

Religion 

The Creoles are Christians, whether nominal or in practice, at over 98 percent. They were instrumental in the establishment of Pan-African Christianity. A large proportion of the settlers from Nova Scotia and the Caribbean were Christians. Many liberated Africans also converted to Christianity. Between 1840 to 1900, at least six out of every ten black African clergy in the Anglican Church across West Africa was a Creole. By the 1820s, Sierra Leone already had more Christians than the entirety of tropical Africa. Institutions such as Fourah Bay College were initially established with the objective of training Christian clergy and educators who were later dispatched across West Africa to spread Christianity.

Creole denominations are mainly Protestant with the Anglican and Methodist churches having the largest Creole congregants. However, smaller denominations such as the Baptist church and Countess of Huntingdon denominations in places such as Freetown, and Waterloo, Sierra Leone also have Creole attendees, although these are smaller in number compared to Creole Anglicans and Methodists.

Creole church attendees congregate at traditional 'Creole' churches such as St. George's Cathedral, Freetown, Trinity Church, Freetown, St John's Maroon Church, Ebenezer Methodist Church, Rawdon Street Methodist Church, and Zion Methodist Church, Wilberforce Street.

Prominent Creole Anglicans include Edward Fasholé-Luke and included Creoles such as Arthur Thomas Porter, Canon Harry Sawyerr and Robert Wellesley-Cole. Well-known Creole Methodists include Sylvia Blyden, a newspaper proprietor and included Creoles such as Macormack Easmon, Edna Elliott-Horton, and George T.O. Robinson, the founder of the Krio Descendants Union.

Although Creoles are primarily Protestant, there are a small number of Creole Catholics who attend Catholic churches such as St. Anthony's Church in Brookfields and the Sacred Heart Cathedral, Freetown. Prominent Creole Catholics include Dr Monty Jones and Bertha Conton and included prominent Creoles such as Florence Dillsworth and in previous generations, James C.E. Parkes.

Language 

The official language of Sierra Leone is English. In addition to English, the Sierra Leone Creoles also speak a distinctive creole language named after their ethnic group called Creole or Krio. Krio was strongly influenced by British English, Gullah, African American Vernacular English, Jamaican Creole, Akan, Igbo and Yoruba.

Krio is widely spoken throughout Freetown and the surrounding towns, such that Krio speakers are no longer presumed to be of the Creole ethnic group.

The Creole people acted as traders and missionaries in other parts of West Africa during the 19th century. As a result of Sierra Leone Creole migratory patterns, in the Gambia, the Gambian Creole or Aku community speak a dialect called the Aku language that is very similar to Krio in Sierra Leone. Fernando Po Creole English is also largely a result of Sierra Leone Creole migrants. A small number of liberated Africans returned to the land of their origins, such as the Saros of Nigeria who not only took their Western names with them but also imported Krio words like sabi into Nigerian Pidgin English.

In 1993, there were 473,000 speakers in Sierra Leone (493,470 in all countries); Krio was the third-most spoken language behind Mende (1,480,000) and Themne (1,230,000). Today, Krio is the most widely spoken language in Sierra Leone utilized by 96 percent of the country's population. It unites all the different ethnic groups, especially in their trade and interaction with each other. Krio is the primary language of communication among Sierra Leoneans living abroad, and has also heavily influenced Sierra Leonean English.

Native Krio speakers of the Creole ethnicity lived principally in Freetown communities, on the Peninsula, on the Banana Islands and York Island, and in Bonthe.

Culture 

Creole culture is a fusion of African, North American and British cultures reflected in both Victorian and Edwardian modes of Christianity, morality, norms and values. The Creoles were  economically dominant in trade and held prominent leadership positions in colonial Sierra Leone and British West Africa. They were  influential in intellectual, technocratic, artisanal, commercial and public life in general, actively participating in multiple fields of scholarly and civic importance. 

From their earliest presence in Sierra Leone and British West Africa, the Creoles, or their ancestors, have significantly contributed science, literature, art, agricultural skills, cuisine, clothing styles,  music, language,  pan-african christianity  and cultural innovation.  Notable examples
include Nova Scotian settlers such as Thomas Peters, David George and Moses Wilkinson who were  founding figures of the nation of  Sierra Leone. In biomedicine, the discovery of the breakdown of insulin in the human body, by Davidson Nicol, was a breakthrough for the treatment of diabetes. John Farrell Easmon  coined the term Blackwater fever and wrote the first clinical diagnosis of the disease linking it to malaria. In agriscience, James Pinson Davies is credited with pioneering cocoa farming in West Africa, while William Vivour was the single most successful 19th-century planter in Africa. Other notable Creoles, or their ancestors, made significant contributions to Sierra Leone and British West Africa, and were   pioneers in several categories of human endeavour.

Marriage and family 

Creoles observe dating and marriage customs that reflect their westernized and broader West African cultural retentions. Creole wedding ceremonies involve the gej or put stop – an elaborate Shakespearean performance in which the hand of the bride is asked for, following the appearance of several 'roses'.  Among the gifts presented by the future groom's representatives are a calabash, some kola nuts, various domestic items a wife would use (such as needles and some thread), but also a Bible, a ring, and some money.

Creole traditional wedding attire is a morning suit or lounge suit for the bridegroom and the  women wear the traditional white wedding dress. Creoles marry in church weddings and in the Victorian and Edwardian era, relatives sought out and introduced prospective suitors from desirable families to their kin seeking a spouse. When a suitor has been chosen by the prospective groom or bride, traditionally the groom's parents set a "put stop" day. After this day, the girl is expected to no longer entertain other suitors. On the evening before the wedding, the groom's friends treat him to "bachelor's eve," a rowdy last fling before marriage.

Ashobis, (parties) at which every guest is expected to wear the same type of materials, are held on the day of the wedding or some days after, for newlyweds.

Creoles live in nuclear families (father, mother, and their children), but the extended family is important to them as well. More affluent family members are expected to help those who are less fortunate. They assist poorer relatives with school fees and job opportunities. In most Creole families, women and elder siblings care for the children who in turn, are expected to complete the household chores.

Twins in Creole society 
Twins are important for the Creole who tend to give special names to each one. The naming convention used by the Creoles comes from their Yoruba  Liberated African ancestry.  The first of the twins to be born is traditionally named Taiyewo or Tayewo, which means 'the first to taste the world', or the 'slave to the second twin', this is often shortened to Taiwo, Taiye or Taye.  Kehinde is the name of the last born twin and it means, 'the child that came behind gets the rights of the elder'.

Music 

Sierra Leonean gumbe music originates from the Jamaican Maroon ancestors of the Creole people. It is  primarily a vocal and percussive musical genre that has been associated with nationalist thought since colonial times.

The gumbe drum is an important cultural symbol played to induce a trance-like state which connects the Creoles with their ancestors. Generally, the music is produced using the gumbe drum, the maracash and the saw. The maracash is a glass bottle and metallic object played together to produce a desirable rhythm. The jagged edge of the saw is rubbed against another sharp object to produce a rasping sound.

In modern times, gumbe music has become a key feature in Sierra Leone's musical landscape. It is often mixed with other more contemporary musical genres to create an authentic local sound.

Attire 
Present-day Creoles, similar to other Sierra Leoneans, wear both African and Western-style dress. Ethnic groups in Sierra Leone had been accustomed to seeing European dress prior to the arrival of the Creoles, as a consequence of extensive trade with Europeans dating to the fifteenth and sixteenth centuries.

However, the ethnic groups who inhabited Sierra Leone did not customarily wear Western-style dress, until they were popularized by the Creole. Like their Americo-Liberian neighbors,  Creole fashion between the Victorian and Edwardian era consisted of a top hat and frock coat for men and a petticoat for women, although some Creole women sometimes wore the Jamaican Maroon Kabaslot and Kotoku,
the latter a Twi or Ga word for money bag.

Although Creoles continue to wear elaborate dress style for special occasions such as weddings and parades, they adapted their styles of dress to incorporate newer Western-style fashion and intricate African-style dresses between the early to late 20th century.

Today, teenage fashion—jeans, T-shirts, and sneakers—are very much in style among young Creole people. However, older Sierra Leone Creoles still dress conservatively in Western-style suits and dresses and some Creole women still wear the Jamaican Maroon Kabaslot, Kotoku, and carpet slippers and its derivative, the "print" that is a fusion of older African American, Afro-Caribbean and British dress styles.

Cuisine 

Breakfast meal of some Creoles consist of porridge or English breakfast typically consisting of fried, poached or scrambled eggs, fried tomatoes or mushrooms, fried bread or buttered toast, and sausages. Noonday meal includes Western style or Caribbean-derived cuisines and also African food.

Creole meals often coincide with specific days of the week. On Saturdays, fufu a dough-like paste made of cassava pounded into flour and a type of palaver sauce or plassas (leafy vegetable sauce) is often eaten. This is a spicy dish consisting of spinach greens with tripe, fish, beef, and chicken. It is often made with palm oil except for wayt soup (white soup). Additionally, other types of typical Creole plassas may be eaten with fufu, such as shakpa, okra, egusi, bologi, greens, krain krain, bitterleaf and  sawa sawa among others.

Sunday dinner is a West African one-pot meal, jollof rice or couscous and stew or peanut soup, including some plantains and salad.  Awujoh meals on Fridays or other festive occasions are usually accompanied by sweet potato cooked in palm oil, black-eyed beans, oleleh, agidi, plantain, furrah and akara with ginger beer. On other days, a variety of local dishes may be consumed.

Rites of passage 

Creoles use combined British Christian cultural practices and certain elements of African rituals in connection with rites of passage such as births and deaths. Creoles have christening and baptismal ceremonies but also have a naming ceremony commonly referred to as pull-na-doh or komojadé on the seventh day following the birth, which is held to celebrate a new-born.

For life cycle ceremonies related to death among the Creoles, one such ceremony is the babichu or barbecue of Jamaican Maroon origin and the subsequently more prevalent Liberated African awujoh feast, intended to celebrate the anniversaries of ancestors who have died. Awujoh feasts are held in remembrance of deceased family members generally the first anniversary of their passing but may also be held on the occasion of the five, ten, fifteen years anniversaries, etc.

Among some Creole families, when someone dies, pictures in the house are turned toward the wall and all mirrors or reflecting surfaces covered. At the wake held before the burial, people clap and sing "shouts"(negro spirituals) loudly to make sure the corpse is not merely in a trance. The next day the body is washed, placed in shrouds (burial cloths), and laid on a bed for a final viewing. Then it is placed in a coffin and taken to the church for the service, and lastly to the cemetery for burial.

The period of mourning lasts one year. On the third, seventh, and fortieth day after death, awujoh feasts are held. The feast on the fortieth day marks the spirit's last day on earth. The family and guests eat a big meal. Portions of the meal and kola nuts are placed into a hole for the dead. The "pull mooning" day – the end of mourning – occurs at the end of one year (the first anniversary of a death). The mourners wear white, visit the cemetery and then return home for refreshments.

Creole folktales 
Creoles have inherited a wide range of proverbs and folktales, including Anansi stories, from their multi-ethnic ancestors including the Jamaican Maroons and the Akan and Ewe Liberated Africans. They entertain and provide instruction in Creole values and traditions. Among the best loved are Creole stories about Anansi the spider. The following is a typical spider tale:

Anansi stories are part of an ancient mythology that is rooted in Liberated African folklore and concerns the interaction
between divine and semi-divine beings, royalty, humans, animals, plants and seemingly inanimate objects.

Creole culture and broader Sierra Leonean cultures 
Oku people

The Oku have origins among the Liberated African community of settlers in Sierra Leone and have historically intermarried  with some Creole people. However, several scholars such as Ramatoulie Onikepo Othman and Olumbe Bassir classify the Oku as distinct from the Creoles because of their ancestry and strong Muslim culture.

In contrast to the Oku people, the Creoles are Christian and are a mixture of various ethnic groups including African Americans, Afro-Caribbeans, and Liberated Africans of Igbo, Akan and Yoruba descent in addition to other African ethnic groups and European ancestry.  Furthermore, unlike the Oku people, the Creoles  do not practice cliterodotomy, engage in the Bundu society, and are monogamous.

More recently, some scholars consider the Oku to be a sub-ethnic group of the Creoles, based on their close association with British colonists and their adoption of Western education and other aspects of culture.
Those classifying the Oku as part of the Sierra Leone Creole people note their adoption of similar English or European surnames  (although this was a minority of Oku) and  cultural aspects such as egungun, gelede, hunters' masquerade, esusu, awujoh and komojadé. However, as scholars have outlined, the few cultural similarities between the Creole and Oku people are because there are some Yoruba cultural retentions from the Christianized Yoruba Liberated Africans  found among the Creoles and because the cultural orientation, heritage, identity and origin of the Oku people are Yoruba in essence.

Sherbro people

According to anthropologist Anaïs Ménard, the only Sierra Leonean ethnic group whose culture is similar (in terms of its embrace of Western culture) are westernized  members of the Sherbro people. Many Sherbro assimilate as Creoles, as they share the Christian faith and often have similar westernized surnames.

Some of the Sherbro interacted with Portuguese and English traders and intermarried with them in the mid-15th to 18th centuries (producing Afro-European clans such as the Sherbro Tuckers and Sherbro Caulkers). As a result, some of the Sherbro have a more westernized culture than that of other indigenous Sierra Leone ethnic groups.

As Creoles settled in places such as Bonthe for trading and missionary purposes, the Creoles intermarried with westernized Sherbros from as far back as the 18th century.

Architecture 

The Creole homeland is a mountainous, narrow peninsula on the coast of west Africa. At its northern tip lies Freetown, the capital. The peninsula's mountain range is covered by tropical rainforests split by deep valleys and adorned with impressive waterfalls. White sand beaches line the Atlantic coast. The whole of Sierra Leone covers some 72,500 square kilometres.

Traditional Creole architecture in the colonial period included a variety of architectural styles ranging and consisting of English-style mansions, smaller to medium stone or brick houses, and traditional one or two-story wooden houses built on stone foundations reminiscent of those found in the Old South, the West Indies or Louisiana.

The distinctive style of Creole wooden or "board" housing was brought by the Settlers from Nova Scotia, and as early as the 1790s, the Nova Scotians had built houses with stone foundations and wooden superstructures, and American-style shingle roofs. However, subsequent African-American and Afro-Caribbean settlers continued to influence Creole architectural styles.

Despite their dilapidated appearance, some of the remaining traditional Creole board houses have a distinctive air, with dormers, box windows, shutters, glass panes, and balconies. The elite live in attractive neighbourhoods such as Hill Station, above Freetown. A large dam in the mountains provides a reliable supply of water and electricity to this area.

Admixture 

Creole ethnicities were formed during the European colonial era, from the mass displacement of peoples brought into sustained contact with others from different linguistic and cultural backgrounds, who converged onto a colonial territory to which they had not previously belonged. Often involuntarily uprooted from their original home, the settlers were obliged to develop and creatively merge the desirable  elements from their diverse backgrounds, to produce new varieties of social, linguistic and cultural norms that superseded the prior forms. This process, known as creolization, is characterized by rapid social flux regularized into Creole ethnogenesis.

Like their Americo-Liberian neighbours, the Creoles of Sierra Leone have varying degrees of European ancestry because some of the settlers were descended from white Americans and other Europeans. Historian David Brion Davis notes the racial mixing that occurred during slavery was frequently attributed by the planter class to the "lower-class White males" but Davis concludes that "there is abundant evidence that many slaveowners, sons of slaveowners, and overseers took black mistresses or in effect raped the wives and daughters of slave families." A famous example was Thomas Jefferson's mistress, Sally Hemings.

After the Revolutionary War, the Book of Negroes listed approximately 3000 "black and mixed-race" loyalists who sailed from New York City to Nova Scotia in 1783. The great majority of families of black people recorded in the US census in the immediate aftermath of the war have been found to have descended from unions between white women (indentured servants or free) and black men (indentured servants, slave or free) in colonial Virginia and other Upper South colonies. Sixty-five percent of those evacuated were from the American South.

Through the Maroons, some Creoles probably also have indigenous Amerindian Taino ancestry. Spanish Jamaica consisted of Spaniards, "natives", enslaved Africans, "black freedmen", mixed-race mulattoes, and those born on the island known as "creole Africans". Genetic  studies on the Jamaican Maroons suggest that their ancestry extends beyond Africa, to include  Amerindian,  European and East Asian progenitors.

On the voyage between Plymouth, England and Sierra Leone, seventy European girlfriends and wives accompanied the Black Poor settlers. There was considerable intermarriage between the Europeans who settled in the colony of Sierra Leone and the various ethnic groups that coalesced into the Creole identity.  The settlers generally married endogamously, although individuals from mixed and European groups recorded a much higher proportion of women and men involved in exogamous marriages. Mixed-race individuals intermarried with Europeans and black colonial residents at the same rate as they married their own.

Alongside the Americo-Liberians, the Creoles of Sierra Leone are the only recognised ethnic group of African-American, Liberated African, and Afro-Caribbean descent in West Africa.

Sierra Leone Creole Diaspora

Historic diaspora 
Historically, Creoles spread Christianity and their lingua franca throughout West Africa, and because of this, Sierra Leone Creole communities existed in Nigeria, Ghana, Cameroon, Senegal, Equatorial Guinea and Liberia. Many Creoles traded throughout West Africa, and some settled in new countries.

Liberated Africans and their colony-born children in the early to mid-19th centuries, and subsequently Creoles between the late 19th and early 20th centuries, who settled in Nigeria, were known as Saros, and there is a thriving community there. Sierra Leone Creoles who settled in the Gambia became part of the Aku or Gambian Creole people; they make up an elite community in Gambia. Many recaptives returned to their original homes after being freed in Freetown, as most kept their anglicised names, they took partially new identities back to their homelands.

Present-day diaspora 
As a result of normal immigration patterns, the Sierra Leone Civil War, and some discrimination at home,  many Sierra Leone Creoles live abroad in the United States and the United Kingdom. What has been called the "Creole Diaspora" is the migration of Sierra Leone Creoles abroad. Many Creoles attend formal and informal gatherings. A Creole or Krio Heritage Society is based in New York City, with branches in places including Texas.

Related communities 
Black Nova Scotians – ancestors of the Sierra Leone Creoles who fought for their freedom on the side of the British during the American Revolutionary War. Initially resettled in Nova Scotia, they arrived in West Africa where they founded the settlement of  Freetown, Sierra Leone in 1792.
Jamaican Maroons – ancestors of the Sierra Leone Creoles who freed themselves from slavery on the Colony of Jamaica. Initially resettled in Nova Scotia, after the Second Maroon War, they eventually arrived in Freetown in 1800.
Americo-Liberians – sister ethnic group of the Creoles of Sierra Leone, comprising African Americans, Afro-Caribbeans and Liberated Africans who founded the settlement of Liberia in 1822.
 Gambian Creoles – descendants of the Creoles of Sierra Leone who migrated to The Gambia in the late 19th and early 20th century.
Saro people (Nigerian Creoles) – sub-ethnic group of the Sierra Leone Creoles who resettled in several Nigerian cities in the late 19th and early 20th century.
Krio Fernandinos – descendants of the Creoles of Sierra Leone who migrated to Bioko island, Equatorial Guinea in the late 19th century.
Gold Coast Euro-Africans – extensively intermarried with Sierra Leone Creole migrants in colonial Ghana.

Notable people of Sierra Leone Creole descent

See also

Explanatory notes

References

Citations

General bibliography

External links 
Creole culture and traditional outfits
Dr. Oloh and his Milo Jazz Band
Johnny Smythe, RAF pilot shot down over Nazi Germany
Sights and sounds of Krio
Meet the Krios of Freetown, Sierra Leone (part 1)
Meet the Krios of Freetown, Sierra Leone (part 2)

 
African people of American descent
African people of Caribbean descent
African-American diaspora in Africa
Creole peoples
Ethnic groups in Sierra Leone
People of Black Nova Scotian descent
People of Jamaican Maroon descent
People of Liberated African descent
Peoples of the African-American diaspora
Repatriated Africans
Repatriated slaves of African American descent
Sierra Leonean Christians
Sierra Leonean people of African-American descent
Sierra Leonean people of British descent
Sierra Leonean people of European descent